The 2019 Moçambola is the 42nd season of Moçambola, the top-tier football league in Mozambique. The season was supposed to start on 30 March 2019, but was delayed to 27 April due to the damages caused by Cyclone Idai.

Due to financial problems, the teams were initially divided into two groups for this season. However, the decision was later revoked on 12 April.

League table

References

Moçambola
Mozambique
football